Nasser Al-Abdeli  (born September 29, 1993) is a Saudi footballer who plays for Al-Arabi as a winger.

References

1993 births
Living people
Saudi Arabian footballers
Al-Ahli Saudi FC players
Ittihad FC players
Al-Nojoom FC players
Ettifaq FC players
Al-Nahda Club (Saudi Arabia) players
Al-Qadsiah FC players
Khaleej FC players
Al-Adalah FC players
Al-Arabi SC (Saudi Arabia) players
Place of birth missing (living people)
Saudi First Division League players
Saudi Professional League players
Association football wingers